Gabriele "Gaby" Bühlmann (born 27 April 1964, in Basel, Switzerland) is a Swiss rifle shooter who competed at five Olympic Games from 1988 to 2004.

She is the coach of 2008 Beijing Olympics gold medal-winning 10m air-rifle shooter Abhinav Bindra.

She is, jointly with equestrian Markus Fuchs, the seventh Swiss sportsperson to compete at five Olympics, after middle-distance runner Paul Martin, equestrians Henri Chammartin and Gustav Fischer, javelin thrower Urs von Wartburg, equestrian Christine Stückelberger, and Alpine skier Paul Accola.

See also
List of athletes with the most appearances at Olympic Games

References

External links

1961 births
Living people
Sportspeople from Basel-Stadt
Swiss female sport shooters
ISSF rifle shooters
Olympic shooters of Switzerland
Shooters at the 1988 Summer Olympics
Shooters at the 1992 Summer Olympics
Shooters at the 1996 Summer Olympics
Shooters at the 2000 Summer Olympics
Shooters at the 2004 Summer Olympics